Ramat Hasharon HC, also known as Ramat Hasharon "S.G.S." HC is a men's handball club from Ramat Hasharon, Israel, that plays in Ligat Ha'Al.

European record

Team

Current squad 
Squad for the 2019–20 season

Goalkeepers
 1. Gil Yaakov
 12. Peleg Daniel
 55. Yahav Shamir
 99. Shahar Tsarfati

Pivot
 3. Daniel Shkalim
 19. Yossi Appo

Winger
 7. Amit Yehuda Gal
 9. Alon Etzion-Oberman
 10. Gil Pomerantz
 34. Amit Motola

Back players
 5. Predrag Vejin
 17.Ori lusternik 
 8. Djordje Djekic
 11. Itay Turkenitz
 12. Milan Pavlovic
 20. Elad Kappon
 23. Itay Hassidim
 24. Nadav Haviv
 63. Guy Yarimi

External links
 EHF Club Profile

Ramat Hasharon HC
Sport in Ramat HaSharon